Arturo García Ortiz (born July 19, 1974) is a Mexican luchador or professional wrestler best known under the ring name Rey Bucanero. Ortiz, as Rey Bucanero, has worked for Consejo Mundial de Lucha Libre (CMLL) since 1996. His ring name is Spanish for "Buccaneer King", which was originally reflected in his mask that featured a skull face and an eye patch. Ortiz was unmasked in 1999 and has worked unmasked ever since.

He is the nephew of Pirata Morgan, from whom he took the Pirate character, as well as the nephew of Hombre Bala and El Verdungo. While he has primarily worked for CMLL through most of his career he has made appearances in the United States, most notably for the World Wrestling Federation and Total Nonstop Action Wrestling as well as in Japan for New Japan Pro-Wrestling (NJPW).

Rey Bucanero, along with Último Guerrero and Tarzan Boy were the founders of the long running Los Guerreros del Infierno ("The Infernal Warriors") group in 2001. Bucanero later left the group to become a member of La Peste Negra and later on help found La Fuerza TRT with El Terrible and El Texano Jr. and the trio TGR  (Terriblemente Guapo el Rey, "Terribly Handsome King"; with El Terrible and Shocker). For the majority of the first decade of the 21st century Rey Bucanero and Último Guerrero formed a very popular and successful tag team, a team that was voted "Best Tag Team of the Decade (2000–2009) " in the Wrestling Observer Newsletter awards.

He is a former four time holder of the CMLL World Tag Team Championship, has held the NWA World Historic Light Heavyweight Championship twice and the CMLL World Light Heavyweight Championship and CMLL World Trios Championship on one occasion. He has also won CMLL's CMLL Torneo Gran Alternativa and Leyenda de Azul tournaments.

Personal life
Arturo García Ortiz was born on July 19, 1974 in Mexico City, Distrito Federal into the Ortiz family which would later have several family members become professional wrestlers. Three of Ortiz's uncles were professional wrestlers and often took him to wrestling shows when he was younger. He is the nephew of Aurelio Ortiz (better known under the ring names Hombre Bala and later "The Monsther"), Pedro Ortiz (best known as Pirata Morgan) and Francisco Ortiz (best known under the name "El Verdungo"), all of whom inspired him to become a wrestler and trained García for his in-ring career. García is the cousin of professional wrestlers El Hijo de Pirata Morgan (Antheus Ortiz Chávez), Pirata Morgan Jr. (real name not revealed), Hombre Bala Jr. (real name not revealed) and the most recent wrestler to work as "The Monsther" (real name not revealed).

García moved in with his uncle Pedro Ortiz when his parents divorced. From that point on his uncle brought him to Arena México, home of Empresa Mexicana de Lucha Libre (EMLL), for whom Ortiz worked at the time. Whole spending time backstage he would be introduced to the other side of professional wrestling, being trained from a very early age by all three of his uncles.

Professional wrestling career
Ortiz made his in-ring debut on November 18, 1991, at the age of 17, as the wrestling masked character "Rey Bucanero Jr." ("Buccaneer King Jr."). Records are unclear if there was a wrestler known as "Rey Bucanero". He performed as "Rey Bucanero Jr." from 1991 through 1994, working primarily smaller shows in Puebla City and other smaller venues. In 1995 he briefly wrestle as "El Hijo de Pirata Morgan" and "Pirata Morgan Jr.", but that stint did not last long, leaving those names behind him on case his uncle Pedro Ortiz's sons wanted to follow in his footsteps when they got older and wanted to wrestle as Pirata Morgan Jr. and El Hijo de Pirata Morgan.

In 1995 he shortened his ring name to simply "Rey Bucanero". The first indication that CMLL had faith in the Rey Bucanero character came in 1996 when the promotion teamed him up with Emilio Charles Jr. for the 1996 Gran Alternativa tournament, which the duo won by defeating Héctor Garza and Mr. Niebla in the finals. The two were joined by El Satánico and together the trio defeated Apolo Dantés, Black Warrior, and Dr. Wagner Jr. in a tournament to win the vacant CMLL World Trios Championship. Their reign only lasted 39 days as they lost the championship to Atlantis, Lizmark and Mr. Niebla on April 29, 1997.

In late 1998 Ortiz was one of many Mexican wrestlers who began working for the World Wrestling Federation (WWF, now known as WWE) as part of the WWF Super Astros show, WWF's attempt to expand into the Latin American markets. On Super Astros Ortiz was known under the ring name Rey "Pirata" Ortiz and wrestled without his mask on. He later stated that he wished the WWF had more respect for the mask, but that a paycheck was a paycheck so he did not complain about it. His stint on Super Astros ended in early 1999.

Months after he returned to CMLL full-time Rey Bucanero was one of eight competitors in a Ruleta de la Muerte ("Roulette of death"), or "Losers advance" tournament. After losing the first two matches Rey Bucanero faced Shocker in the finals with both wrestlers putting their mask on the line under Lucha de Apuestas. or "bet match", rules. In the end Shocker pinned Rey Bucanero, forcing Bucanero to remove his mask and never wear it again.

Los Infernales

In 1999 El Satánico reformed the group Los Infernales, recruiting Último Guerrero and Rey Bucanero; Rey's uncle Pirata Morgan had been part of the original Los Infernales. Working with the veteran El Satánico allowed both Rey Bucanero and Último Guerrero to rise up the ranks as well as develop into a regular tag team in CMLL. In the summer of 2000 Bucanero and Guerrero were one of sixteen teams entered into a tournament for the vacant CMLL World Tag Team Championship. In the end they defeated Villano IV and Mr. Niebla to win the championship.

Throughout the summer of 2000 El Satánico had been working a storyline against Tarzan Boy, which was used to turn both Bucanero and Último Guerrero against El Satánico. Bucanero, Guerrero and Tarzan Boy claimed that they deserved the name Los Infernales and that El Satánico was holding them back. For the storyline El Satánico recruited two other wrestlers to even the numbers, which on TV was presented as if he used his "Satanic powers" to turn wrestler Rencor Latino into Averno (Spanish for "Hell") and transformed the Astro Rey Jr. into a character known as Mephisto.

When Tarzan Boy was injured and unable to wrestle Bucanero and Guerrero recruited Máscara Mágica to even the numbers. The storyline between the two factions reaches its high point at the CMLL 68th Anniversary Show where all seven wrestlers faced off in a steel cage match. The stipulation of the match was that the winning side would gain the rights to use the name Los Infernales while the loser on the opposite side would be forced to unmask or have their hair shaved off. In the end El Satánico pinned Máscara Mágica, forcing him to unmask. After losing the match Guerrero, Bucanero and Tarzan Boy became known collectively as Los Guerreros del Infierno (The Infernal Soldiers).

Los Guerreros del Infierno

After the feud with El Satánico ended Bucanero and Guerrero moved on to a storyline feud with Negro Casas and El Hijo del Santo over the CMLL World Tag Team Championship. After a match with an inconclusive finish in October, Los Guerreros lost to Santo and Casas on November 2, 2011. In 2002, Guerrero and Bucanero regained their tag team title from Santo and Casas. defeating them on May 31 to become three-time champions. The team successfully defended their title against Damián 666 and Halloween of La Familia de Tijuana in July. Los Guerreros del Infierno then began feuding with Vampiro Canadiense and Shocker. Los Guerreros successfully defended their tag team championship against the duo but Bucanero lost his hair to Vampiro in a Luchas de Apuestas match in December.

In 2003, they retained the championship against Vampiro and Lizmark, Jr. and Negro Casas and Perro Aguayo, Jr. but were defeated in December by the team of Shocker and the newly arrived L.A. Park. Los Guerreros regained the tag team championship in early 2004, but Bucanero suffered a knee injury and was temporarily replaced by Black Warrior. Los Guerreros lost the tag team title to Atlantis and Blue Panther on June 25. Bucanero and new Los Guerreros member Olímpico challenged Atlantis and Panther for the tag team championship on the first Arena México show of 2005 but they lost when Olímpico injured his neck while attempting a dive.

Bucanero and Olímpico teamed up to unsuccessfully challenge the visiting Hiroshi Tanahashi and Shinsuke Nakamura for the IWGP World Tag Team Championship. After Atlantis turned heel and joined the group, they became known as Los Guerreros de la Atlántida, it was teased that Bucanero would break up with Guerrero but Bucanero stayed with the group and Los Guerreros feuded with Perro Aguayo, Jr.'s Los Perros del Mal faction into 2006. At the end of April, he teamed with Tarzan Boy to win a double hair vs. hair match against Mr. Águila and Damián 666 in the main event of the 50. Aniversario de Arena México show.

The following week, he teamed with Atlantis against Último Dragón and Keiji Mutoh but his team lost after Atlantis hit Rey Bucanero by accident. For the following weeks, Bucanero kept having trouble with his teammates and magazines hinted at a possible face turn. Later that month, Averno and Mephisto turned on him during an Arena México match. Shortly afterwards, Tarzan Boy and Guerrero turned on him as well, ripping his tights, signifying he was no longer a member of Los Guerreros.

On July 14, he defeated Guerrero for his CMLL World Light Heavyweight Championship, ending Guerrero's three and a half year title reign. He later feuded with Kenzo Suzuki and Último Guerrero. In 2008 Bucanero participated in Total Nonstop Action Wrestling's World X Cup as a part of Team Mexico, who ended up winning the whole tournament. By early 2010 Bucanero returned to Los Guerreros del Atlantida.

La Peste Negra

In July and August 2010 Rey Bucanero filled in for Mr. Niebla while he was out with a knee injury and teamed up with La Peste Negra ("The Black Plague") members Negro Casas and El Felino. When he began teaming with La Peste Negra Bucanero wore ring gear that looked more like Jack Sparrow from the Pirates of the Caribbean movie series and less like his fellow Guerreros de la Atlantida members. He was also given a mascot, a Mini-Estrella wearing a parrot outfit that accompanied him to the ring. The parrot was later named Zacarias.

In August 2010, Rey Bucanero announced that he had left Los Guerreros and joined La Peste Negra because Los Guerreros were more interested in teaming with Olímpico than him. On December 3 at Sin Piedad 2010 Bucanero defeated Los Invasores leader Mr. Águila in a Lucha de Apuesta match, forcing Mr. Águila to have his orange mohawk shaved off. On January 29, 2011, Bucanero made an appearance for American promotion Pro Wrestling Guerrilla (PWG), during the WrestleReunion 5 weekend, in a match, where he was defeated by Mr. Águila.

TRT / TGR

In April 2011 Bucanero left La Peste Negra to form a new group with El Texano, Jr. and El Terrible, abandoning Zacarias in the process. The following month, the group was named La Fuerza TRT. On June 21 Bucanero defeated El Hijo del Fantasma to win the NWA World Historic Light Heavyweight Championship. On July 31, 2011, Bucanero and Atlantis made an appearance for American promotion Chikara, losing to F.I.S.T. ("Friends In Similar Tights"; Chuck Taylor and Johnny Gargano) via disqualification, when Gargano faked taking a low blow from Atlantis.

On September 30 at CMLL's 78th Anniversary Show, Bucanero took part in a ten-man hair vs. hair steel cage match, which came down to Bucanero and former Peste Negra partner El Felino. In the end, El Felino managed to pin Bucanero, forcing Bucanero to have all his hair shaved off. In October 2011, Bucanero became one of four CMLL wrestlers featured in an A&E Latinoamericano documentary series titled El Luchador. When El Texano, Jr. left CMLL in late November, Bucanero and El Terrible chose Tiger as the new third member of La Fuerza TRT.

On June 4, 2013, Bucanero's near two-year reign as the NWA World Historic Light Heavyweight Champion ended, when he lost the title to Diamante Azul. On August 11, Bucanero and Terrible removed Tiger from the La Fuerza TRT group and replaced him with Vangelis. With Vangelis joining the group, the stable was renamed TRT: La Máquina de la Destrucción ("TRT: The Machine of Destruction"). On September 14, Bucanero captured the CMLL World Tag Team Championship alongside Tama Tonga, while on tour with New Japan Pro-Wrestling (NJPW). Bucanero's tour with NJPW lasted until September 29, and upon his return to CMLL, Bucanero and Tonga began teaming with El Terrible as "Bullet Club Latinoamerica".

On October 18, Bucanero was sidelined with an injury and both he and Tonga were stripped of the CMLL World Tag Team Championship. On March 8, 2015, Bucanero defeated La Sombra in a tournament final to win the NWA World Historic Light Heavyweight Championship for the second time. On April 3, Bucanero, El Terrible and Shocker formed a new trio named TGR (Terriblemente Guapo el Rey, "Terribly Handsome King").

Championships and accomplishments
Consejo Mundial de Lucha Libre
CMLL World Light Heavyweight Championship (1 time)
CMLL World Tag Team Championship (4 times) – with Último Guerrero (3) and Tama Tonga (1)
CMLL World Trios Championship (1 time) – with El Satánico and Emilio Charles, Jr.
NWA World Historic Light Heavyweight Championship (2 times)
Carnaval Incredible Tournament (2000) – with Último Guerrero and Mr. Niebla
Copa de Arena Mexico (1999) – with El Satánico and Último Guerrero
Torneo Gran Alternativa (1996 (II)) – with Emilio Charles, Jr.
Leyenda de Azul: 2006
Federación Universitaria de Lucha Libre
FULL World Championship (1 time,current)
International Wrestling Revolution Group
Copa Higher Power (1999) – with Astro Rey Jr., Máscara Mágica, El Satánico and Último Guerrero
Pro Wrestling Illustrated
PWI ranked him #39 of the 500 best singles wrestlers of the PWI 500 in 2005
Total Nonstop Action Wrestling
TNA World X Cup (2008) – with Volador Jr., Último Guerrero and Averno
Wrestling Observer Newsletter awards
Best Tag Team of the Decade (2000–2009) – with Último Guerrero

Luchas de Apuestas record

Footnotes

References

External links

1974 births
Bullet Club members
Living people
Mexican male professional wrestlers
Professional wrestlers from Mexico City
20th-century professional wrestlers
21st-century professional wrestlers
CMLL World Light Heavyweight Champions
CMLL World Tag Team Champions
CMLL World Trios Champions
NWA World Historic Light Heavyweight Champions